was a public university in the town of Nagayo in Nagasaki Prefecture, Japan. Established in 1999, the school merged with Nagasaki Prefectural University to form University of Nagasaki in 2008.

External links
 Official website

Educational institutions established in 1999
Universities and colleges in Nagasaki Prefecture
1999 establishments in Japan
Defunct public universities in Japan